Erzsébet Némethné Bajári (born Erzsébet Némethné, and published as Erzsébet N. Bajári; (1912–1963) was a Hungarian entomologist, specifically a wasp researcher.

Biography 
Bajári graduated from the Biography Chemistry Faculty of Eötvös Loránd University in Budapest, Hungary as a teacher.  

In 1948 she took a position at the Hymenoptera (insect) collection of Hungarian Natural History Museum, and starting in 1954, continuing until 1963, she was the curator of the collection. At the beginning she started to process the collection of Sphecidaes and later on she went on to Ichneumonidaes. She was the first specialist to do this work since the death of Győző Szépligeti.

Bajári took over as editor of The Folia Entomologica Hungarica journal in 1963, but her sudden death shortly thereafter prevented her from completing the issue she had begun.

She died in 1963.

Selected works

 Fauna catalog of the families Methocidae, Myrmosidae and Mutillidae A Methocidae, Myrmosidae és Mutillidae családok faunakatalógusa. (Cat. Hym. V.) Rovartani közlemények: a Magyar Rovartani Társaság kiadványa = Folia entomologica Hungarica, 1954. (7. évf.) 1. sz. 65-80. oldal (Társszerző: Dr. Móczár László)
 Dagger wasps. Tőrösdarázs alkatúak – Scolioidae 1956 (Magyarország Állatvilága - Fauna Hungariae XIII. kötet 3. füzet 1-35 old.
 Scraper wasps I. Kaparódarázs alkatúak I. – Sphecoidae I. 1957 (Magyarország Állatvilága – Fauna Hungariae XIII kötet 7. füzet. 1-117 old.
 Scout wasps I. Fürkészdarázs-alkatúak I. – Ichneumonoidae I. 1960 Akadémia Kiadó, Budapest, (Magyarország Állatvilága – Fauna Hungariae XI. kötet 4. füzet, 72 ábrával) 266 oldal.
 Scout wasps XII. Fürkészdarázs-alkatúak XII. – Ichneumonoidae XII. 1962 Akadémia Kiadó, Budapest, (Magyarország Állatvilága – Fauna Hungariae XI. kötet 15. füzet, 24 ábrával. Társszerző: Dr. Győrfi János) 54 oldal.

References

External sources 
http://www.nhmus.hu/hu/gyujtemenyek/allattar/hartyasszarnyuak/reszletes
http://bogaraskonyvek.blog.hu/2011/02/01/a_folia_entomologica_hungarica_masodik_idoszaka_1946
https://web.archive.org/web/20160204221731/http://moly.hu/konyvek/gyorfi-janos-n-bajari-erzsebet-furkeszdarazs-alkatuak-xii-ichneumonoidea-xii
http://www.nhmus.hu/en/collections/department_of_zoology/hymenoptera_collection
http://www.smmi.hu/termtud/ns/ns1/ceram.pdf
http://mek.oszk.hu/02100/02185/html/961.html
http://www.zobodat.at/pdf/ENTAU_0017_0215-0226.pdf

1912 births
1963 deaths
Hungarian entomologists
20th-century Hungarian zoologists
Hungarian women curators